Day of Reckoning is a 1933 American pre-Code drama film starring Richard Dix, Madge Evans and Conway Tearle. It is based on a novel by Morris Lavine. When a man is sent to prison, his wife is romanced by another man.

Plot
John Day is arrested for a shortage in his accounts at work. His wife Dorothy asks for help from lusting friend George Hollins, who orders John's lawyer to assure that John receives a two-year jail sentence.

Cast
 Richard Dix as John Day
 Madge Evans as Dorothy Day
 Conway Tearle as George Hollins
 Una Merkel as Mamie
 Stuart Erwin as Jerry
 George McFarland as Johnny Day (as Spanky McFarlane)
 Isabel Jewell as Kate Lovett
 James Bell as Slim
 Raymond Hatton as Hart
 Paul Hurst as Harry
 John Larkin as Abraham
 Wilfred Lucas as Guard
 Samuel S. Hinds as O'Farrell

References

External links
 
 
 
 

1933 films
1930s prison films
1933 romantic drama films
Adultery in films
American black-and-white films
American prison drama films
American romantic drama films
Films based on American novels
Films directed by Charles Brabin
Metro-Goldwyn-Mayer films
1930s English-language films
1930s American films